Edward Yum Liang-Hsien (born 1979) is an entrepreneur and was a member of the Hong Kong pro-democracy camp People Power.  He is the son of former Legislative Council member Yum Sin-ling, who once held a pro-Kuomintang party in Hong Kong called the 123 Democratic Alliance.
Edward was born in Hong Kong, his ancestral hometown is dongguan city, Guangdong province.

Career
Edward is best known for his participation at the Victoria Park, City Forum.  He is known for shouting at pro-establishment figures, which earned him the nickname "Big brother of Victoria park".  He has also been called the Grass Mud Horse.

Edward graduated from University of Illinois at Urbana-Champaign (USA) with a BSc in Finance, Edward concreted his expertise in funds and trust through his career among banks and financial institutions namely HSBC, Bank of Montreal, Pacific Global Bank, Old Second National Bank, and Hang Seng Bank, in both the United States and Hong Kong for over 20 years altogether. Edward, who assisted clients for setting up funds and trust in an amount of billions of USD.

In 2014, Edward founded AYASA Globo Financial Services Limited and is now the Group CEO. He is also the founder of APLUS Investments, shareholder of Ever Fountain Asset Management, shareholder and Director of GreenPro Trust, shareholder and Director of 3R Consulting, INED of 8120.hk, Director of AG Opportunity Fund SPC & AG Digital Asset Fund SPC.

Edward is a member of AIMA HK & AIMA APAC Digital Assets Working Group. He is also the Founding Member and Executive of The Association of Chartered Wealth Management. Edward also earned the certificate in the “Corporate Governance: Regulatory Considerations and Implications Program” by University of Southern California US-China Institute. Edward’s long-standing successes in the financial services industry earned his recognitions and he is now the Director of 28 companies and funds in Hong Kong, the Cayman Islands, and BVI.

Edward is the guest lecturer for the course “Fund Governance” of “Master of Corporate Governance & Compliance” at Hong Kong Baptist University. He is the scholarship sponsor of the “Edward Yum International Service Learning Awards” & “Edward Yum Outstanding Performance Scholarships for Economics and Finance Students” at City University of Hong Kong. He is the best-selling author of the book “Mastering Cryptocurrency Funds” and magazine columnist of “Strategist”.

Controversy

License issue
Questions have been raised about Edward being described as a licensed Securities and Futures Commission representative when his permit was expired.  In his weekly column and the website of iMoney magazine and the League of Social Democrats website, he has been described as a representative.

Sex scandal accusations
In mid December 2010 a 29-year-old woman in Sha Tin accused Yum of rape and indecent assault.  After the first arrest Edward considered suing a local newspaper and a woman for their comments since this arrest.  On 20 December 2010 a 19-year-old woman in Central filed a police report against Edward for sexual assault. This also came at a time after 30 pan-democrats resigned over the dissatisfaction with a leadership meeting with Beijing.  The group was extremely fragmented with internal political issues.

By May 2011, Edward was no longer under investigation by the police due to a complete lack of evidence.

2018 Legislative By-election
On 23 January 2018, Edward declared that he would run in the Hong Kong Island by-election triggered by the disqualification of Demosisto's Nathan Law. Edward received 3580 votes and was not elected.

See also
Hong Kong Localism Power (2015)

References

Living people
League of Social Democrats politicians
People Power (Hong Kong) politicians
1979 births